Naphtali Luccock (1853–1916) was an American bishop of the Methodist Episcopal Church, elected in 1912.

He was born on 28 September 1853 in Kimbolton, Ohio. He entered the traveling ministry of the Pittsburgh Annual Conference of the M.E. Church (which at that time included eastern Ohio) in 1874.  Later he was transferred to the St. Louis conference.

Before his election to the episcopacy, Luccock was a pastor. His was a brief episcopal incumbency, for he died within his first four years, on 1 April 1916 in La Crosse, Wisconsin. He was buried in Bellefontaine Cemetery in St. Louis, Missouri.

He is the author of The Illustrated History of Methodism (1901), with J. W. Lee and J. M. Dixon, and The Royalty of Jesus (1905), sermons.

References

Other sources
 Leete, Frederick DeLand, Methodist Bishops. Nashville, The Methodist Publishing House, 1948.
 Methodism: Ohio Area (1812-1962), edited by John M. Versteeg, Litt.D., D.D. (Ohio Area Sesquicentennial Committee, 1962).

See also
 List of bishops of the United Methodist Church

1853 births
1916 deaths
American Methodist bishops
Bishops of the Methodist Episcopal Church
People from Guernsey County, Ohio
Burials at Bellefontaine Cemetery